Thibaudeau station is a flag stop in Thibaudeau, Manitoba, Canada.  The station stop is served by Via Rail's Winnipeg–Churchill train.

References

External links 
Via Rail Station Information

Via Rail stations in Manitoba